The Azio-class minelayer was a class of six minelayers conceived in 1920 and built between 1924 and 1927 in Italy for the Regia Marina. The ships were conceived for colonial purposes and in this role they spent almost the whole Italian career. Some units were sold to the Bolivarian Navy of Venezuela where they served until their decommissioning and scrapping in the early 1950s.

Project
These units had a standard displacement of 615 t, between 708 and 718t in normal load, 954 t full load (850 t according to other sources). They were manned by 5 officers and 66 ratings.

Ships were built at Monfalcone, near Trieste, in the Cantiere Navale Triestino (CNT Shipyard) and at Ancona, on the central Italian coast, in the Cantiere Navale Riuniti (CNR, Ancona).
The CNT ships (Dardanelli, Millazo and Ostia) were oil-fired, while the CNR ships (Azio, Legnano and Ostia) were coal-fired.

Units
 Azio
 
 Legnano
 Ostia
 Dardanelli
 Milazzo

History
Ships of the class spent their Italian career on colonial duty, with Lepanto deployed to China. In 1937 Milazzo and Dardanelli were converted to oil-firing and sold to the Venezuelan Navy in exchange of a great amount of naphtha for boilers.

Lepanto was extensively used in China, and when the Second World War broke out, was still there unscathed, Italy being allied with Japan. After the surrender of Italy to the Allies on 8 September 1943, Lepanto was scuttled by her crew, but was raised by the Japanese. She was renamed Okitsu (Japanese: 興津) and used for escort duties for the rest of conflict. She was then seized by the Republic of China Navy and renamed Hsien Ning (咸寧). In July 1950 Hsien Ning seized a British merchantman. Struck in 1956, the ship was scrapped in the same year.

Ostia was assigned to support the Italian Red Sea Flotilla based at the port of Massawa, Eritrea. After the Italian declaration of war, the flotilla was isolated from the Italian homeland and continued supply and reinforcement became very difficult. Ostia was eventually sunk in Massawa harbor by British air attacks before the surrender of the port in April 1941, still carrying a full cargo of mines.

Dardanelli was rechristened General Soublette, while Milazzo become General Urdaneta. Both were reclassified gunboats. These units were the only relatively new vessels of the Venezuelan Navy, and spent their Venezuelan career patrolling territorial waters until their decommissioning in the late 1940s or early 1950s and scrapping.

References

External links
 Azio-class minelayer Marina Militare website

Naval ships of Venezuela
Minelayers of Italy
Ships built in Italy
Ships built by Cantieri Navali del Tirreno e Riuniti
Gunboats of the Imperial Japanese Navy